A slider or track bar is a graphical control element with which a user may set a value by moving an indicator, usually horizontally. In some cases user may also click on a point on the slider to change the setting. It is different from a scrollbar in that it is not continuous but used to adjust a value without changing the format of the display or the other information on the screen.

Its most popular use is for viewing and jumping to a playback position in media player software.

Usage with progress bars 
Sliders are also combined with progress bars in the playback of streaming media over a network connection (e.g., YouTube videos) in order to show the content buffering position versus the playback position. This is done by superimposing a colored shaded area (progress bar) on top of the slider, indicating whether the user can "jump" forward or not.

External links 
 Yahoo! UI Library
 ASP.NET AJAX Control Toolkit
 script.aculo.us wiki

Graphical control elements